Phyllocnistis nepenthae is a moth of the family Gracillariidae, known from Sumatra, Indonesia. The hostplant for the species is Nepenthes tobaica.

References

Phyllocnistis
Nepenthes infauna
Endemic fauna of Indonesia